Robert Eben "Robbie" Venter (born 7 May 1960) is a South African businessman and former professional tennis player.

Biography
A left handed player from Boksburg, Venter is the son of South African businessman Bill Venter.

Venter was a semi-finalist at the Wimbledon Juniors in 1978 and moved to the United States that year to take up a tennis scholarship at UCLA. He was a three-time All-American and captained the UCLA side which won the team title in the 1982 NCAA Division I Tennis Championships. After that triumph he became a tour professional and with former UCLA teammate Blaine Willenborg he was runner-up in the doubles at the 1982 U.S. Men's Clay Court Championships, a tournament on the Grand Prix circuit held in Indianapolis. His only singles appearance in the main draw of a grand slam tournament came at the 1983 Wimbledon Championships, where he lost in the first round to Rodney Harmon, in four sets. During his tennis career he won six Challenger titles, three in singles and three in doubles.

Venter retired from tennis in 1985 and completed an MBA at UCLA before working at Bear Stearns for three years. He returned to South Africa in 1990.

In 2011 he replaced his father Bill as CEO of Altron.

Grand Prix career finals

Doubles: 1 (0–1)

Challenger titles

Singles: (3)

Doubles: (3)

References

External links
 
 

1960 births
Living people
South African male tennis players
UCLA Bruins men's tennis players
University of California, Los Angeles alumni
South African chief executives